Ho Wi-ding (born 30 November 1971) is a Malaysia-born Taiwanese filmmaker.

Life and career
Ho was born in Malaysia of Chinese ethnic background, and he graduated from Tisch School of the Arts at New York University. In 2001, he moved to Taipei where his sister lived in, and started working on commercials and shorts. He finished his feature debut Pinoy Sunday in 2010, winning him the Best New Director Award at 47th Golden Horse Awards.

His third feature Cities of Last Things had its world premiere at the 2018 Toronto International Film Festival, and was awarded the Platform Prize.

Ho married Taiwanese film director . The pair co-directed Terrorizers.

Filmography
Feature filmsPinoy Sunday (2010)Beautiful Accident (2017)Cities of Last Things (2018)Terrorizers (2021)

TelefilmsMy Elder Brother in Taiwan (2012)The Biggest Toad in the Puddle'' (2015)

References

External links

1971 births
Living people
New York University alumni
Malaysian people of Chinese descent
Malaysian film directors
Taiwanese film directors
Malaysian emigrants to Taiwan